The Regius Professorship of Moral Philosophy is a Regius Chair at the University of Aberdeen. It was created in the 16th century, in the early years of the university's existence.

List of Regius Professors

 1760–1797: James Beattie
 1820–1821: John Lee
 1894–1900: William Ritchie Sorley
 1902–1924: James Black Baillie
 1924–1946: John Laird
 1947–1960: Donald M. MacKinnon
 1960–1981: Archibald Garden Wernham
 1996–2006: L. Gordon Graham
 2009–2012: Catherine Wilson

References

Professorships at the University of Aberdeen
Moral Philosophy
Professorships in philosophy